The 2011–12 season of the Bolivian Liga Nacional B, the second category of Bolivian football, was played by 13 teams.

Teams

 Guabirá (relegated in 2008) and Nacional Potosí (relegated in 2009) will play in the 2011–12 Liga Nacional A.

Group stage

Serie A

Serie B

Cuadrangular Final

Standings

Tiebreaker Playoff

Petrolero promoted to 2012–13 Primera División
Destroyers go to Promotion Playoff.

External links
 Liga Nacional B

Liga Nacional B seasons
2011–12 in Bolivian football
Bolivian
Bolivian